Pierre Strauwen was a Belgian swimmer. He competed in the men's 200 metre breaststroke event at the 1908 Summer Olympics.

References

External links
 

Year of birth missing
Year of death missing
Belgian male breaststroke swimmers
Olympic swimmers of Belgium
Swimmers at the 1908 Summer Olympics
Place of birth missing